Bahrah is a town in Makkah Province, in western Saudi Arabia. Bahra is located in the Tihama region down the valley between the towns of Fatima Jdhomkh. It is divided into several districts and population centers are (old town Bahra - New Bahra City - Bahra Mujahideen neighborhood - Posts neighborhood - neighborhood find - villages footwear - Village The able - Garihachammasa - villages depth). The town of Bahra is the old station for pilgrims, due to its location between Mecca and Jeddah, and also Bahra is the first town passes from the middle of a paved road in the Kingdom of Saudi Arabia which is the road between Mecca and Jeddah.

See also 

 List of cities and towns in Saudi Arabia
 Regions of Saudi Arabia

References
2.https://www.makkah.gov.sa/page/provinces 

Populated places in Mecca Province